Skjærpe is a Norwegian surname. Notable people with the surname include:

Arvid Weber Skjærpe (born 1947), Norwegian journalist and director
Bjørn Skjærpe (1898–?), Norwegian gymnast

Norwegian-language surnames